Southern Syria (سوريا الجنوبية, Suriyya al-Janubiyya) is the southern part of the Syria region, roughly corresponding to the Southern Levant. Typically it refers chronologically and geographically to the southern part of Ottoman Syria provinces.

The term was used in Arabic primarily from 1918–20, during the Arab Kingdom of Syria period. Zachary Foster in his Princeton University doctoral dissertation has written that, in the decades prior to World War I, the term “Southern Syria” was the least frequently used out of ten different ways to describe the region of Palestine in Arabic, noting that “it took me nearly a decade to find a handful of references”.

Background
Throughout the Ottoman period, prior to World War I, the Levant was administered, taxed and viewed locally as one entity, divided into provinces. Geographically southern Syria included the southern sub-provinces of Ottoman Syria administrative region, including by the end of 19th and early 20th century the Mutasarrifate of Jerusalem, the Nablus Sanjak and Acre Sanjak (under Beirut Vilayet from 1888 and previously under Syria Vilayet), and a short-lived Mutasarrıfate of Karak (split as a new administrative unit from Syria Vilayet in 1894/5). In 1884, the governor of Damascus proposed the establishment of a new Vilayet in southern Syria, composed of the regions of Jerusalem, Balqa' and Ma'an though nothing came out of this.

At the start of Faisal’s reign in the Arab Kingdom of Syria, the term Southern Syria became synonymous with Palestine. After 1918 it would take on an increased political significance as a way of rejecting the separation of the British Mandate from Syria.

Usage during British and French occupation

In early 20th century, the term "Southern Syria" could imply support for the Greater Syria nationalism associated with the kingdom promised to the Hashemite dynasty of the Hejaz by the British during World War I. After the war, the Hashemite prince Faisal attempted to establish such a Greater Syrian or pan-Mashriq state—a united kingdom that would comprise all of what eventually became Syria, Lebanon, Israel, Jordan, and Palestine, but he was stymied by conflicting promises made by the British to different parties (see Sykes–Picot Agreement), leading to the French creation of the mandate of Syria and Lebanon in 1920. 

According to the Minutes of the Ninth Session of the League of Nations' Permanent Mandates Commission, held in 1926, "Southern Syria" was suggested by some as the name of Mandatory Palestine in the Arabic language. The reports say the following:
"Colonel Symes explained that the country was described as 'Palestine' by Europeans and as 'Falestin' by the Arabs. The Hebrew name for the country was the designation 'Land of Israel', and the Government, to meet Jewish wishes, had agreed that the word "Palestine" in Hebrew characters should be followed in all official documents by the initials which stood for that designation. As a set-off to this, certain of the Arab politicians suggested that the country should be called 'Southern Syria' in order to emphasize its close relation with another Arab State". In 1932, an Arab party named "the Arab Independence Party in Southern Syria" was established in Mandatory Palestine to emphasize the reaffirmed support for Arab pan-Syrianism.

References

External links
 Helsinki.fi−Levant internetcourse: Brief history of Southern Syria

Ottoman Syria
History of the Levant
Ottoman Palestine